Nephrocystin-1 is a protein that in humans is encoded by the NPHP1 gene.

Function 

This gene encodes a protein with src homology domain 3 (SH3) patterns. Mutations in this gene cause familial juvenile nephronophthisis.

Interactions 

NPHP1 has been shown to interact with BCAR1, PTK2B, Filamin and INVS.

References

Further reading